Stentor muelleri, also called a trumpet ciliate, is a single-celled eukaryote which feeds on algae. Stentor muelleri is a heterotrich.

References

Heterotrichea